(or , in the Portuguese version) is a live video and album by the American heavy metal band Metallica, recorded at Foro Sol, Mexico City, Mexico, on June 4, 6 and 7, 2009, during the World Magnetic Tour. It was supposed to be released in Latin America only, but it is also available in Northern Europe. The record was released in four formats:

A DVD containing 19 tracks
A Blu-ray of the DVD
A digipak with the DVD and two CDs
A deluxe version in a slipcase with two DVDs and two CDs

It also features interviews with the band members and all the credits in Spanish (and Portuguese for Brazil). On September 22, 2010, the deluxe version was released in Japan containing the two DVDs and two SHM-CDs.

Track listing

DVD 1
DVD, DVD/2CD, 2DVD/2CD & Blu-ray

DVD 2
2DVD/2CD

CD 1
DVD/2CD & 2DVD/2CD
"The Ecstasy of Gold" - 1:57
"Creeping Death" - 6:20
"For Whom the Bell Tolls" - 5:29
"Ride the Lightning" - 7:09
"Disposable Heroes" - 8:22
"One" - 9:05
"Broken, Beat & Scarred" - 6:48
"The Memory Remains" - 5:32
"Sad but True" - 7:05
"The Unforgiven" - 5:50

CD 2
DVD/2CD & 2DVD/2CD
"All Nightmare Long" - 8:04
"The Day That Never Comes" - 8:06
"Master of Puppets" - 8:13
"Fight Fire with Fire" - 6:48
"Nothing Else Matters" - 5:57
"Enter Sandman" - 8:18
"The Wait" - 4:16
"Hit the Lights" - 6:33
"Seek & Destroy" - 7:37

Reception

Personnel
James Hetfield - lead vocals, rhythm guitar
Lars Ulrich - drums
Kirk Hammett - lead guitar, backing vocals
Robert Trujillo - bass, backing vocals

Chart performance

References

Live video albums
2009 video albums
Metallica video albums
2009 live albums
Metallica live albums
Universal Records live albums
Universal Records video albums